Matthias Paul may refer to:

 Matthias Paul (actor) (born 1964), a German actor
 Matthias Paul (DJ) (born 1971), a German DJ, producer and musician known under the stage name Paul van Dyk

See also
 
 

 Matthias (given name)
 Paul (name)